Peña or de la Peña is a Spanish habitation surname. The origin of the surname can be traced directly to the Middle Ages, it is also a Sephardic surname; the earliest public record of the surname dates to the 13th century in the Valley de Mena (Burgos) in the Kingdom of Castile. The origin of the last name is in present-day Galicia, Spain. The Peñas lived, originally, near a cliff or rocky land. Records indicate that the name derives from the Spanish word peña meaning "rock," "crag" or "cliff."

The bearers of this surname proved their noble descent in the Order of Saint James of the Sword in 1626, 1629, 1651 and 1657; in the Order of Calatrava, in 1657, 1687, 1688, 1700 and 1785; in the Order of Alcántara in 1644 and 1693 and in the Royal and Distinguished Spanish Order of Carlos III, in 1790 and 1838; and many times in the Royal Audiencia and Chancillería of Valladolid; in the Royal Audience of Oviedo, in 1788 and 1795; and in the Royal Company of Midshipmen in 1767.

The Peñas have a great presence in Mexico. There are two towns most notably that are full of Peña families. One is in the town called Talpa, Jalisco and the other is Las Varas, Nayarit. They have been known to be wealthy property owners.

Notable Peñas 

Alejandro Peña Esclusa (born 1954), Venezuelan leader of the NGO Fuerza Solidaria and president of the NGO UnoAmérica
Alfredo Peña (1944–2016), Venezuelan journalist and politician
Antonio Peña (disambiguation), several people
Carlos Peña (disambiguation), several people
Cristina Peña (born 1976), Spanish actress
Dan Peña (born 1945), American-Scottish businessman and author
Elizabeth Peña (1959–2014), American actress 
Ellen Hart Peña (born 1958), American world-class runner and lawyer
Enrique Peña Nieto (born 1966), President of Mexico (2012–2018)
Enrique Peña Sánchez (1880–1922), Cuban musician
Federico Peña (born 1947), American politician
Gabriela Peña (born 1995), Dominican footballer
Horacio de la Peña (born 1966), Argentinean tennis player
José Francisco Peña Gómez (1937–1998), Politician from the Dominican Republic, leader of the Dominican Revolutionary Party (PRD).
José Peña (born 1987), Venezuelan steeplechaser
Luis Sáenz Peña (1822–1907), President of Argentina (1892–1895)
Manuel de la Peña y Peña (1789–1850), interim president of Mexico from September to November 1847 and president from January 1848 to June 1848
Manuel la Peña (1808–1811), or Lapeña, Spanish military officer who served during the Peninsular War
Miguel Peña (1781–1833), Venezuelan politician
Nicolás Rodríguez Peña (1775–1853), businessman and politician, a key figure during the May Revolution in Argentina
Pedro Pablo Peña Cañete (1864–1943), President of Paraguay (1912)
Ramón María del Valle-Inclán y de la Peña, Marquess de Bradomin, (1866–1936), Spanish dramatist, novelist and member of the Spanish Generation of 98
Roque Sáenz Peña (1851–1914), President of Argentina (1910–1914)
Sergio Peña (disambiguation), several people
Tony Peña (disambiguation), several people
Tony Peña (born 1957), Dominican baseball player
William Merriweather Peña (1919–2018), American architect

Holders of Spanish titles of nobility and lordships in the 21st century 

People with surname de la Peña or Peña holding a title of nobility in Spain at present include:

Don Ramiro Pérez-Maura y de la Peña, Grandee of Spain, Duke de Maura and Count de Mortera (Granted in 1930 and 1876 respectively)
Don Antonio González de Aguilar y de la Peña, Marquess de Arenal (Granted in 1847)
Don Magín Peña y Lorca, Marquess de Ogijares (Granted in 1889)
Doña Marina Peña y Paradela, Countess de Gaviria (Granted in 1837)
Doña Helena de la Peña y Robles, Countess de Xauen (Granted in 1929)
Doña Matilde Francisca Barriouevo y Peña, Vincountess de Barrionuevo (Granted in 1891)
Don William de la Peña Yappen, Marques of Villar del Águila (Granted in 1689)

Other

Adarand Constructors v. Peña – United States Supreme Court case

Further reading 

Elenco de grandezas y títulos nobiliarios españoles 2006 Ampelio Alonso de Cadenas y López/Hidalguía
Blasonario de la consanguinidad ibérica 1980

References

External links 
4crests.com: Peña Coat of Arms

Spanish-language surnames